La Cornisa is an Argentine weekly news show, hosted by Luis Majul. It began to be aired in 2000 at Canal 7 Argentina, and moved to América TV and then to La Nacion +.

Argentine television talk shows
América TV original programming
Televisión Pública original programming
2000 Argentine television series debuts